The N56 road is a Belgian national road linking Mons to Lessines passing through a junction with the Belgian A8 motorway.

056